Faugh is an exclamation indicating disgust. It can also refer to:

Derived from the Irish word 
Faugh A Ballagh, a battle cry of Irish origin
Faughs GAA Club, a Gaelic sports club in Dublin, Ireland
Castleblayney Faugh's GAC, a Gaelic sports club in County Monaghan, Ireland
Faugh-a-Ballagh, a 19th-century Irish racehorse

Other
Faugh, Cumbria, a village in the City of Carlisle District in England